The following is a list of awards and nominations received by English actor Daniel Radcliffe. 

Radcliffe is known for his roles in film, television, and theatre. He is best known for playing the role of Harry Potter in the film series of the same name between 2001 and 2011. He is also known for his roles on the West End and Broadway theatre.

Major associations

Critics' Choice Awards

Canadian Screen Awards

Empire Awards

Theatre awards

Grammy Awards

Drama Desk Award

Drama League Award

Outer Critics Circle Award

Audience awards

Broadway Audience Awards

MTV Movie Awards

Nickelodeon Kids' Choice Awards

People's Choice Awards

Scream Awards

Teen Choice Awards

Miscellaneous awards

Chlotrudis Awards

Catalunya Film Festival

Glamour Awards

National Film Awards UK

National Movie Awards

Saturn Award

Shanghai International TV Festival

J-14's Teen Icon Awards

Do Something Awards

Hollywood Women's Press Club

Chainsaw Awards

OFTA Television Award

Notes

References

Radcliffe, Daniel